Placidus is Latin for "placid, gentle, quiet, still, calm, mild, peaceful" and can refer to:

Flavius Arcadius Placidus Magnus Felix (480–511), Consul of Rome
Placidus de Titis (also de Titus, Latinization of Placido de Titi, 1603–1668), astrologer
Placidus Böcken (1690–1752), German Benedictine canon lawyer, Vice-Chancellor of the University of Salzburg
Placidus Braun (1756–1829), Bavarian Benedictine priest, historian and archivist
Placidus Fixlmillner (1721–1791), Benedictine priest, first astronomer to compute the orbit of Uranus
Placidus Nkalanga (1919–2015), Tanzanian Prelate of Roman Catholic Church
Saint Placidus, follower of St. Benedict
Saint Placidus (martyr), Sicilian martyr
Placidus a Spescha (1752–1833), Swiss monk and Alpine explorer

See also
Placidian system,  for calculating astrological houses
Lucanus placidus, beetle in the Family Lucanidae
Placido (disambiguation)
Placid